Sittwe Township is a township of Sittwe District in the Rakhine State of Myanmar. The principal town is Sittwe.

Demographics

2014

The 2014 Myanmar Census reported that Sittwe Township had an estimated population of 150,735. The population density was 1,289.5  people per km2. The census reported that the median age was 26.8 years, and 91 males per 100 females. There were 29,036 households; the mean household size was 4.8.

References

Sittwe
Townships of Rakhine State